The Bukit Ketri railway station is a Malaysian railway station of the West Coast Line located at Bukti Ketri, Perlis. It is served by the train route No. 2 (Butterworth–Padang Besar) under KTM Komuter Northern Sector.

Location and locality 
Bukit Ketri station is specifically located in Bukit Ketri, Perlis, Malaysia and is near to a few major places in Perlis like Chuping and Beseri. Its distance from the state capital, Kangar is only 15 kilometres and there's a bus connection heading to the town that make a stop here. 

Railway stations in Perlis
Railway stations opened in 2015